Leire is a Basque feminine given name that is derived from the name of the Monastery of San Salvador of Leyre in Navarre, Spain. It was among the top 10 most popular names given to newborn girls in Basque Country in Spain in 2011. Leire is therefore quite a well known name in Spain and Basque Country.

Notable people with the name
 Leire Aramendia (born 1993), handballer
 Leire Baños (born 1996), footballer
 Leire Iglesias (born 1978), judoka
 Leire Landa (born 1986), footballer 
 Leire Martínez (born 1979), singer and musician
 Leire Morlans (born 1987), skier
 Leire Olaberria (born 1977), cyclist 
 Leire Pajín (born 1976), politician 
 Leire Santos (born 1979), diver

Notes

Feminine given names
Basque feminine given names